Dangsing is a town and Village Development Committee  in Kaski District in the Gandaki Zone of northern-central Nepal. At the time of the 1991 Nepal census it had a population of 3,533 persons living in 794 individual households.

References

External links
UN map of the municipalities of Kaski District

Populated places in Kaski District